Argobba is an Ethiopian Semitic language spoken in an area north-east of Addis Ababa by the Argobba people. It belongs to the South Ethiopic languages subgroup along with Amharic and the Gurage languages.

Writing in the mid-1960s, Edward Ullendorff noted that it "is disappearing rapidly in favour of Amharic, and only a few hundred elderly people are still able to speak it." Today, many Argobba in the Harari Region are shifting to the Oromo language.

The language is spoken in a number of pockets and has at least four regional variations (dialects) in Harar (extinct), Aliyu Amba, Shewa Robit and Shonke.

Notes

References 
 Cohen, Marcel (1931) Études d'éthiopien méridional (Collection d'ouvrages orientaux). Paris: Geuthner. 
 Cohen, Marcel (1939) Nouvelles Études d'éthiopien méridional. Paris: Ancienne Honoré Champion. 
 Leslau, Wolf (1997) Ethiopic Documents: Argobba. Grammar and dictionary. Wiesbaden: Harrassowitz. .
 Zelealem Leyew and Ralph Siebert (1994) Argobba. S.L.L.E. Linguistic Reports no. 22. Addis Ababa: SIL/Institute of Ethiopian Studies, Addis Ababa University.
 Zelealem Leyew, Ralph Siebert (2002), Sociolinguistic Survey Report of the Argobba Language of Ethiopia SIL Electronic Survey Reports, SILESR 2002-026 (PDF)

Languages of Ethiopia
Transverse Ethiopian Semitic languages
Endangered languages of Africa